Liang Guanglie (also spelled as Liang Kuang-lieh; born December 1940 in Santai, Mianyang, Sichuan) is a retired general and former Minister for National Defense in the People's Republic of China.

Life and career 

Liang joined the army in January 1958 and the Chinese Communist Party in November 1959. His first assignment was with the Second Regiment, First Division of the 1st Ground Force Army (1958–63), where he  rose to the ranks of commander of an engineering company, quartermaster of the special agent company and staff officer in the operations and training branch. Liang studied at the Xinyang Infantry School (1963–64) and graduated from Henan University's political theory correspondence education program (1984–86). After finishing his studies, Liang returned to his unit until 1970 when he was promoted to the Operational Department staff of the Wuhan Military Region command headquarters where he remained until 1979.

Liang was named Deputy Commander of the 58th Division, 20th Group Army in 1979 and became commander in 1981-83. After a study break at the PLA Military Academy (March 1982 to January 1983), he was named deputy Commander of the 20th Army in 1983 and Commander in 1985.  In June 1989, he led the 20th Army to enforce martial law in Beijing to suppress the Tiananmen Square Protests. In 1990 he was transferred to command the 54th Army and from December 1993 to July 1995, he was the chief of staff of Beijing Military Region. From July 1995 to December 1997, he was the deputy commander of Beijing Military Region. From December 1997 to December 1999, he was the commander of Shenyang Military Region, and from December 1999 to November 2002, he was the commander of Nanjing Military Region and deputy secretary of CCP's committee.

Liang was the General Chief of Staff of the People's Liberation Army from 2002 to 2007. He then served as a State Councilor and the Minister of National Defense. Additionally Liang was a member of Central Military Commission. He was also an alternate member of the 13th and 14th CCP Central Committees, and a member of the 15th, 16th and 17th Central Committees.

Liang retired at the 18th National Congress of the Chinese Communist Party in late 2012 and was replaced by General Chang Wanquan.

References

Citations

Sources 

 
 China's General Chen Bingde appointed to key military post (AFP via the Straits Times)

External links 
 

1940 births
Chiefs of staff
Living people
Ministers of National Defense of the People's Republic of China
People from Mianyang
People's Liberation Army generals from Sichuan
People's Liberation Army Chiefs of General Staff
Commanders of the Shenyang Military Region
Chiefs of Staff of the Beijing Military Region
1989 Tiananmen Square protests and massacre
State councillors of China